(–)-Germacrene D synthase (EC 4.2.3.75) is an enzyme with systematic name (2E,6E)-farnesyl-diphosphate diphosphate-lyase ((–)-germacrene-D-forming). This enzyme catalyses the following chemical reaction

 (2E,6E)-farnesyl diphosphate  (–)-germacrene D + diphosphate

In Solidago canadensis the biosynthesis results in the pro-R hydrogen at C-1 of the farnesyl diphosphate ending up at C-11 of the (–)-germacrene D .

References

External links 
 

EC 4.2.3